The following is a list of musicals that have won the Tony Award or Laurence Olivier Award for Best Musical. Highlighted shows are currently running on either Broadway or West End as of April 2022.

See also
 Broadway theatre
 West End theatre
 Lists of musicals
 Musical theatre
 Tony Award for Best Musical
 Laurence Olivier Award for Best New Musical
 AFI's 100 Years of Musicals
 Long-running musical theatre productions
 List of Tony Award- and Olivier Award-winning plays

References

External links
Ganzl, Kurt. The Encyclopedia of Musical Theatre (3 Volumes). New York: Schirmer Books, 2001.
The Cyber Encyclopedia of Musical Theatre, TV and Film

West End musicals
 
Toy award